Andrion is a genus of beetles belonging to the family Curculionidae.

Species:
 Andrion regensteinense

References

Curculionidae
Curculionidae genera